Low Yat may refer to:
Low Yat, father of Malaysian property developer Low Yow Chuan
Plaza Low Yat, a shopping centre in Kuala Lumpur, Malaysia